The 2020 General Tire 150 was the second stock car race of the 2020 ARCA Menards Series, the first race of the 2020 Sioux Chief Showdown, and the inaugural iteration of the event. The race was held on Friday, March 6, 2020, in Avondale, Arizona at Phoenix Raceway, a 1 mile (1.6 km) permanent low-banked tri-oval race track. The race took the scheduled 150 laps to complete. Chandler Smith of Venturini Motorsports would take the final restart with two to go and hold off teammate Michael Self and a dominating Ty Gibbs to win his eighth career ARCA Menards Series win and his first of the season. To fill out the podium, Michael Self of Venturini Motorsports and Ty Gibbs of Joe Gibbs Racing would finish second and third, respectively.

Background 

Phoenix Raceway is a one-mile, low-banked tri-oval race track located in Avondale, Arizona. It is named after the nearby metropolitan area of Phoenix. The motorsport track opened in 1964 and currently hosts two NASCAR race weekends annually. PIR has also hosted the IndyCar Series, CART, USAC and the Rolex Sports Car Series. The raceway is currently owned and operated by International Speedway Corporation.

The raceway was originally constructed with a 2.5 mi (4.0 km) road course that ran both inside and outside of the main tri-oval. In 1991 the track was reconfigured with the current 1.51 mi (2.43 km) interior layout. PIR has an estimated grandstand seating capacity of around 67,000. Lights were installed around the track in 2004 following the addition of a second annual NASCAR race weekend.

Phoenix Raceway is home to two annual NASCAR race weekends, one of 13 facilities on the NASCAR schedule to host more than one race weekend a year. The track is both the first and last stop in the western United States, as well as the fourth and the last track on the schedule.

Entry list 

*Withdrew.

Practice 
The only two-hour practice session was held on March 6.

Qualifying 
Qualifying was held on Friday, March 6 at 2:30 PM MST. Each driver was split into six groups, and each group would run four minute sessions.

Full qualifying results

Race results

References 

2020 ARCA Menards Series
NASCAR races at Phoenix Raceway
March 2020 sports events in the United States
2020 in sports in Arizona